S. petiolaris may refer to:
 Salix petiolaris, a species in the genus Salix
 Siparuna petiolaris, a species in the genus Siparuna
 Solidago petiolaris, a goldenrod species in the genus Solidago
 Stemonoporus petiolaris, a species of plant endemic to Sri Lanka
 Synaphea petiolaris, a species in the genus Synaphea

See also
 Petiolaris (disambiguation)